Zhang Jing may refer to:

 Zhang Jing (Ming dynasty) (died 1555), Ming dynasty general

Sportspeople
 Zhang Jing (speed skater) (born 1973), Chinese speed skater and coach of the Hungarian team
 Zhang Jing (ice hockey) (born 1977), Chinese ice hockey player
 Zhang Jing (volleyball) (born 1979), Chinese volleyball player
 Zhang Jing (water polo) (born 1996), Chinese water polo player
 Zhang Jing (diver), in events such as the World Aquatics Championships